Vernon High School may refer to:

Vernon High School (Vernon, Florida)
Vernon High School (Vernon, Texas)

See also 
 Vernon Secondary School, Vernon, British Columbia